Straight from the Heart is a 1994 American short documentary film directed by Dee Mosbacher and co-directed by Frances Reid. It was nominated for an Academy Award for Best Documentary Short.

The documentary explored relationships between straight parents and their gay children. The film includes emotional interviews with a straight couple that did not approve of homosexuality and disowned their gay child, who died of AIDS shortly after.

References

External links
Straight from the Heart at Woman Vision

1994 films
1994 documentary films
1994 short films
1994 LGBT-related films
American short documentary films
American independent films
American LGBT-related short films
Documentary films about LGBT topics
Documentary films about families
1990s short documentary films
1994 independent films
1990s English-language films
1990s American films